Danishka Esterhazy (born in Winnipeg, Manitoba) is a Canadian screenwriter and film director. She is best known for her thriller and horror movies, such as Black Field (2009), Level 16 (2018), The Banana Splits Movie (2019), and the Slumber Party Massacre (2021) remake.

Career
Esterhazy is well known for her haunting stories and female-driven films. Her debut feature, Black Field, won the Best Feature Drama award at Vancouver's Women in Film Festival and the Best Canadian Feature award at Toronto's Female Eye Film Festival.

Esterhazy's films have screened in festivals and theaters and around the world including the Rome International Film Festival, the Puchon International Film Festival in South Korea, the Short Film Festival of India, La Maison Rouge in Paris and Kölner Filmhaus in Germany.

Her films have been broadcast on CBC Television, Bravo and Super Channel. Danishka is also a recipient of the prestigious Kodak New Vision Award for Most Promising Female Canadian Director awarded by Women in Film and Television Toronto. She also won the UBC Creative Writing Award for Best Screenplay at the 2015 Vancouver International Women in Film Festival.

She won the Canadian Screen Award for Best Direction in a TV Movie at the 10th Canadian Screen Awards in 2022, for I Was Lorena Bobbitt.

Education
Esterhazy graduated from the Canadian Film Centre and the National Screen Institute.

Filmography
Short film

Feature film

Television

Awards

|-
| 2010
| Toronto Female Eye Film Festival
| Best Canadian Feature for: Black Field
| 
|-
| 2013
| Women in Film and Television International
| Most Promising Female Canadian Director
| 
|}

References

External links
 

1969 births
Canadian women film directors
Film directors from Winnipeg
Living people
Writers from Winnipeg
Canadian women screenwriters
Canadian Film Centre alumni
21st-century Canadian screenwriters
21st-century Canadian women writers
Canadian television directors
Canadian women television directors
Canadian Screen Award winners
Canadian people of Hungarian descent